Joaquim Juncosa (Cornudella, Tarragona, 1631 – Rome, 1708) was a Spanish Baroque painter and monk of the Carthusian order.

Born into a family of painters, he soon began to receive commissions, both from monasteries of the order he belonged to and from private residences. Out of these, four large mythological canvasses stand out, commissioned by the marquis of la Guardia, governor of Sardinia.

Highly skilled at drawing, his works reflect a restrained Baroque style, and some experts have identified in it the influence of his stays in Rome and his contact with Roman painting trends.

Some of his documented works were destroyed in 1936 in the riots that occurred in the first few months of the Spanish Civil War, during which many religious buildings were damaged. In spite of that, some of his pieces are still preserved at the Sant Jordi Fine Arts Academy, in Barcelona, and in the Museo del Prado, in Madrid, among other collections, together with the fifteen canvasses that make up the set called “Mysteries of the Rosary”, located at the Carthusian monastery in Valldemossa (Majorca).

References

External links
 Joaquin Juncosa Museo del Prado
 Joaquim Juncosa Real Academia de la Historia
Joaquim Juncosa Enciclopèdia Catalana

Spanish Baroque painters
Painters from Catalonia